Nam District (Nam-gu) is a district of Ulsan, South Korea. Its name literally means "South Ward".

History
Nam District was established on July 15, 1985. On January 1, 1995, Ulsan City Nam-gu was consolidated after the merging of Ulsan City and Ulsan County. On July 15, 1997, Ulsan Metropolitan City Namgu was established after Ulsan was elevated to Metropolitan status.

Administrative divisions
Nam district is further divided into neighbourhoods. These neighbourhoods include:
 Daehyeon-dong
 Dal-dong
 Mugeo-dong
 Ok-dong
 Samho-dong
 Samsan-dong
 Seonam-dong
 Sinjeong 1-dong
 Sinjeong 2-dong
 Sinjeong 3-dong
 Sinjeong 4-dong
 Sinjeong 5-dong
 Suam-dong
 Yaeum-Jangsaengpo-dong

Symbols 
Nam-gu's symbols include:
the camellia, depicts harmony between the four seasons and symbolizes the vibrance and enthusiasm of Nam-gu residents;
the dove represents peace and prosperity and symbolizes the desire of Nam-gu residents to work together to build a better community;
the gingko tree, a tree that is resistant to disease and pollution, represents the will to grow strong and optimally and symbolizes the permanent prosperity of Nam-gu residents.

Until 2013, Nam-gu's mascot was Tabi: a 7-year-old boy, who symbolizes the vision of a strong, healthy, and beautiful Nam-gu. The current mascot that is used since 2014 is Jangseng-i, symbolizes Korean gray whale motivated from Jangsaengpo Whale Special District.

Local attractions
Samsan-dong contains Ulsan's downtown. This is among the more affluent areas of the city. There are twelve scenic areas in Ulsan and are advertised throughout the city.  There is a tour bus leaving each day that will take a person to some of these sites for a fee. There is a tourist information building in Samsan-dong where you can get more information on attractions and tour bus times.
Jangsaengpo Whale Museum
Seonam Lake Park
Ulsan Culture & Arts Center
Ulsan Grand Park
Ulsan Museum
Ulsan Science Museum
Ulsan Wholesale Agricultural and Fish Market
Ulsan Industrial Center Monument Rotary Intersection (Gongeoptap Rotary) is the most rushing intersection because it connects 5 different boulevards and most city transit, and thanks to this the place is popular with teenagers and tourists.

Education
Ulsan University (울산대학교)
Ulsan College West Campus (울산과학대학교)

Transport
The Ulsan expressway runs west from Nam District and connects with Eonyang in central Ulju County. The Busan–Ulsan Expressway runs south through Ulju County to Haeundae District in Busan.

Sister cities
Seocho-Gu, Seoul, South Korea

Liaoyang city, China

See also
List of districts in South Korea

References

External links
Official site 
Official site